The Oregon State Treasurer is a constitutional officer within the executive branch of the government of the U.S. state of Oregon, elected by statewide vote to serve a four-year term. As chief financial officer for the state, the office holder heads the Oregon State Treasury, and with the Governor and Secretary of State, serves on the Land Board.

The current state treasurer is Tobias Read, who was elected in 2016, and won reelection in 2020.

Divisions
 Finance Division - acts as the central bank for all state agencies and is the largest financial institution in the state.
 Investment Division - manages the portfolio of investments for the state's funds.
 Debt Management Division - coordinates bonds issued by the state and its agencies, and monitors relevant markets and economic trends.
 Information Services Division - responsible for the Treasury's technological infrastructure.
 Executive Division - develops economic policy through strategic planning, legislative initiatives; performs the department's administrative functions, and publishes all Treasury reports.

List of Oregon treasurers

Provisional treasurers
Those who served as the Treasurer of the Provisional Government of Oregon prior to the creation of the Oregon Territory.

Territorial treasurers
Those who served as the Treasurer of the Oregon Territory.

State treasurers
The individuals who have served as state treasurer since its admission to the Union are listed on the table below. Except where noted, treasurers were elected on a statewide ballot and served one or more full terms.

References

External links
Official website

 
1843 establishments in Oregon Country